The Five Pieces for Orchestra (Fünf Orchesterstücke), Op. 16, were composed by Arnold Schoenberg in 1909, and first performed in London in 1912. The titles of the pieces, reluctantly added by the composer after the work's completion upon the request of his publisher, are as follows:

The Five Pieces further develop the notion of "total chromaticism" that Schoenberg introduced in his Three Piano Pieces, Op. 11 (composed earlier that year) and were composed during a time of intense personal and artistic crisis for the composer, this being reflected in the tensions and, at times, extreme violence of the score, mirroring the expressionist movement of the time, in particular its preoccupation with the subconscious and burgeoning madness.

Premiere

The work had its world premiere in the Queen's Hall, London at a Promenade Concert on 3 September 1912, conducted by Sir Henry Wood, a constant champion of new music. During rehearsals for Schoenberg's suite he urged his reluctant players, "Stick to it, gentlemen! This is nothing to what you'll have to play in 25 years' time" The work was not well received; the critic Ernest Newman, who was receptive to Schoenberg's music, wrote after the performance:

Instrumentation
The work exists in two different scorings: the original 1909 version for a very large orchestra and the revised version of 1949 which reduces the size of the orchestra to more-or-less normal proportions, "giving up the contrabass clarinet, as well as the four-fold scoring of the other woodwinds and two of the six horns". This version was published posthumously in 1952.

Original 1909 version

Woodwinds
Piccolo
3 Flutes (3rd doubling on 2nd piccolo)
3 Oboes
English horn
Clarinet in D
3 Clarinets (3rd doubling on contrabass clarinet in A)
Bass clarinet
3 Bassoons
Contrabassoon

Brass
6 Horns
3 Trumpets
4 Trombones
Tuba

Percussion
Timpani
Bass drum
Crash cymbals
Suspended cymbals
Triangle
Tam-tam
Xylophone
Celesta

Strings
Harp
Violins I, II
Violas
Violoncellos
Double basses

Revised 1949 version

Woodwinds
Piccolo
3 Flutes (3rd doubling on 2nd piccolo)
2 Oboes
English horn
E Clarinet
2 Clarinets
Bass clarinet
2 Bassoons
Contrabassoon

Brass
4 Horns
3 Trumpets
3 Trombones
Tuba

Percussion
Timpani
Bass drum
Cymbals
Suspended cymbals
Triangle
Tam-tam
Xylophone
Celesta

Strings
Harp
Violins I, II
Violas
Violoncellos
Double basses

Third movement

According to Robert Erickson, "harmonic and melodic motion is curtailed, in order to focus attention on timbral and textural elements". Blair Johnston claims that this movement is actually titled "Chord-Colors", that Schoenberg "removes all traditional motivic associations" from this piece, that it is generated from a single harmony: C–G–B–E–A (the Farben chord, shown below), found in a number of chromatically altered derivatives, and is scored for "a kaleidoscopically rotating array of instrumental colors".

Whether or not this was an early example of what Schoenberg later called Klangfarbenmelodie (in his 1911 book Harmonielehre) is a matter of dispute. One scholar holds that Schoenberg's "now-famous statements about 'Klangfarbenmelodie' are, however, reflections, which have no direct connection to the Orchestra Piece op. 16, no. 3". An attempt to refute this view was published in the same journal issue.

Schoenberg explains in a note added to the 1949 revision of the score, "The conductor need not try to polish sounds which seem unbalanced, but watch that every instrumentalist plays accurately the prescribed dynamic, according to the nature of his instrument. There are no motives in this piece which have to be brought to the fore".

Second performance and influence
Wood invited Schoenberg to conduct London's second performance of the work in 1914. The composer's only British pupil, Edward Clark, conveyed the invitation and on 17 January 1914 Schoenberg conducted the work at the Queen's Hall. The laughter and hissing of the first performance were not repeated, and the work was heard in silence and politely applauded. The composer was delighted with the performance and congratulated Wood and the orchestra warmly: "I must say it was the first time since Gustav Mahler that I heard such music played again as a musician of culture demands." This concert may have been attended by Gustav Holst, who obtained a copy of the score, the only Schoenberg score he ever owned. Echoes of the work appear in The Planets (originally titled Seven Pieces for Large Orchestra), and in the opening of his ballet The Lure (1921), which closely resembles the third of Schoenberg's Five Pieces.

Recordings 
 Two piano arrangement by Anton Webern, performed by James Winn and Cameron Grant, Albany Records CD TROY992, UPC 034061099222
 Berlin Philharmonic, James Levine conducting, Deutsche Grammophon 419781
 Chicago Symphony Orchestra, Rafael Kubelík conducting, Mercury Living Presence 434397
 Chicago Symphony Orchestra, Daniel Barenboim conducting, Teldec 98256
 Cleveland Orchestra, Christoph von Dohnányi conducting, Decca 436240
 London Symphony Orchestra, Antal Doráti conducting, Mercury Living Presence 432006
 London Symphony Orchestra, Robert Craft conducting, Naxos 8557524
 Royal Concertgebouw Orchestra, Riccardo Chailly conducting, Decca 436467
 Royal Concertgebouw Orchestra, Eduard van Beinum conducting, Andante 4060
 Bavarian Radio Symphony Orchestra, Hermann Scherchen conducting, Orfeo D'or 274921
 Saarbrücken Radio Symphony Orchestra, Hans Zender conducting, Cpo 999481
 Sinfonieorchester des Südwestfunks, Michael Gielen conducting, Wergo WER 60185-50
 BBC Symphony Orchestra, Pierre Boulez conducting, Sony 48463

References 

Sources

Further reading

 Burkhart, Charles. "Schoenberg's Farben: An Analysis of op. 16, no. 3". Perspectives of New Music 12 (1973–74): 141–172.
 Craft, Robert. "Schoenberg's Five Pieces for Orchestra". In Perspectives on Schoenberg and Stravinsky, revised edition, edited by Benjamin Boretz and Edward T. Cone, 3–24. New York: W. W. Norton, 1972.
 Forte, Allen. The Structure of Atonal Music. New Haven and London: Yale University Press, 1973.
 Förtig, Peter. "Arnold Schönberg über Klangfarbe". Melos 36 (1969): 206–209.
 Mäckelmann, Michael. Arnold Schönberg: Fünf Orchesterstücke op. 16. W. Fink, Munich, 1987. 
 
 Rahn, John. "Analysis Two: Schoenberg's Five Peces for Orchestra: Farben, op. 16 no. 3". In his Basic Atonal Theory, 59–73. New York and London: Longman, 1980. .
 Schoenberg, Arnold. Style and Idea. University of California Press, Los Angeles, 1984.

External links 
 Five Pieces for Orchestra, Schoenberg.at
 

1909 compositions
Atonal compositions by Arnold Schoenberg
Compositions for symphony orchestra
Expressionist music
Stefan Zweig Collection